Panayotis Alexander "Alexi" Lalas (born June 1, 1970) is an American retired soccer player who played mostly as a defender. Lalas is best known for his participation with the United States men's national soccer team in the 1994 FIFA World Cup, where he was a standout player on the team with his distinctive long beard and hair. After the World Cup, Lalas went on to become the first American in Italy's Serie A as a member of Calcio Padova.

Lalas would later return to the United States in 1996 to take part in the newly formed Major League Soccer, as a member of New England Revolution. Lalas also played with Club Sport Emelec of Ecuador, and the MLS squads MetroStars and Kansas City Wizards, but his most successful period was with Los Angeles Galaxy, with whom he won the CONCACAF Champions' Cup, Lamar Hunt U.S. Open Cup and MLS Cup before retiring in 2002. Lalas' playing style was characterized by physical ability and endurance.

Following his playing career, Lalas served as general manager of the San Jose Earthquakes, New York Red Bulls, and Los Angeles Galaxy of Major League Soccer. He was elected to the National Soccer Hall of Fame in 2006. He currently works as an analyst for Fox Sports. He also was a reporter at the Qatar 2022 World Cup

Personal life
Lalas was born in Birmingham, Michigan, United States, to a Greek father, Demetrios Lalas and an American mother, Anne Harding Woodworth. His father was a professor who later became the director of Greece's national observatory, while his mother is a widely published poet. Lalas speaks Spanish and Italian in addition to his native English and Greek. Lalas is married and has two children. His younger brother, Greg Lalas, is a retired professional soccer player and currently the Chief Marketing Officer at United Soccer League. Lalas attended the elite Dalton School.

Club career

High school
Lalas attended Cranbrook Kingswood School in Bloomfield Hills, Michigan. Even though he did not begin playing soccer until he was eleven, he had developed his skills enough to be named the 1987 Michigan High School Player of the Year by his senior year. In addition to playing soccer, he was a member and captain of his high school hockey team, which won the state championship. Lalas was rated for the Ontario Hockey League Midget draft in 1987, but was ultimately not selected.

College 
Lalas attended Rutgers University, where after trying out and playing some spring matches and an indoor tournament in 1988, he played on the men's soccer team from 1988 to 1991. During his four seasons at Rutgers with the Scarlet Knights he reached the NCAA Final Four in 1989 and the National Championship Game in 1990.
Lalas was named a third-team All-American in 1989 and 1990. In 1991, he gained first-team All-American recognition and was selected for both the Hermann Trophy and the Missouri Athletic Club Player of the Year award. As he did in high school, Lalas also played hockey in college, leading the team in scoring in 1989.

Lalas left Rutgers in 1991 to focus on the U.S. national team despite being interested in finishing his degree. He resumed his education in 2013, when Rutgers began offering enough online classes to fulfill what Lalas required to graduate. Lalas took 12 classes and 36 credits over 10 months to finish what he jokingly called "a 26-year plan", earning a bachelor's degree in English with a minor in music in May 2014.

After college and the 1992 Summer Olympics, Lalas trained with former Arsenal player Bob McNab in California. This led to a trial with Arsenal during the winter of 1992. It was quickly determined that Lalas did not have the quality for a first team spot. As a result, Lalas only had a few training sessions with the Reserve team before being cut shortly after his arrival in North London. Lalas then returned home in Detroit and spent a month reluctant about his future in soccer before coach Bora Milutinovic invited him for the United States tryouts in Mission Viejo, California.

Padova
After the 1994 FIFA World Cup, Lalas signed with Italian Serie A club Padova. While Lalas anchored the team's defense and scored three goals off set pieces (including against A.C. Milan and Internazionale), Padova finished the 1994–95 season 14th in the table. Only after winning a relegation play off on June 10, 1995, did the team ensure its survival in the top ranks for the next season. On June 25, 1995, Major League Soccer (MLS) signed Lalas to play for one of the new league's teams. While MLS had intended to begin playing in 1995, it had run into difficulties and so delayed the first season until 1996. In order to allow Lalas to maintain his match fitness, MLS loaned him back to Padova for the 1995–96 season. Lalas last played for Padova in a home game against Lazio on February 25, 1996.

Major League Soccer
Before the inaugural Major League Soccer (MLS) draft in February 1996, the league allocated high-profile players throughout the league's ten teams (except for the Dallas Burn, which alone amongst all MLS sides never received a U.S. national team allocation from the 1994 World Cup era). As part of this process, MLS placed Lalas with the New England Revolution. Lalas was a regular on the Revs backline during the 1996 and 1997 seasons. In November 1997, the Revolution loaned Lalas to Ecuadorian First Division Club Emelec for a month. He returned to New England at the end of December only to find himself traded to the MetroStars on February 4, 1998. He spent the 1998 season with the MetroStars before being traded, along with Tony Meola, to the Kansas City Wizards for Mark Chung and Mike Ammann on January 28, 1999. Lalas spent one season with the Wizards before announcing his retirement on October 10, 1999.

Just over a year later, he returned to playing when he signed with the Los Angeles Galaxy as a discovery player on January 14, 2001. Nearly three years later, he retired again, this time permanently, on January 12, 2004.

International career
Lalas earned 96 caps, scoring nine goals, with the United States national team between 1991 and 1998. His first cap came in a 2–2 tie with Mexico on March 12, 1991, in the 1991 NAFC Championship.  He gained his second cap four days later in a 2–0 win over Canada. While he started both games, he did not gain another cap until he came on for Fernando Clavijo in a 2–2 tie with Denmark on January 30, 1993. His next game, a start, came on March 23, 1993, in a 2–2 tie with El Salvador. While he became a fixture on the team through the rest of 1993, he did not cement his position as a starter in the U.S. central defense until the beginning of 1994. He went on to start and play all ninety minutes in the four U.S. games of the 1994 FIFA World Cup and was named an honorable mention All-Star. On June 11, 1995, Lalas flew directly from a relegation playoff game with his club team, Padova, in order to appear in the second half of a 1995 U.S. Cup victory over Nigeria.  His contributions to the national team led to his selection as the 1995 U.S. Soccer Athlete of the Year. He also scored in a game against Saudi Arabia, in which the United States had their biggest comeback in their history (from 3–0 to 4–3; Lalas scored the first goal for the United States). While Lalas was on the roster for the U.S. at the 1998 FIFA World Cup, he never entered a game.  His last cap had come in the final U.S. tuneup for the finals, a May 30, 1998, scoreless tie with Scotland where he was a second-half substitute for Earnie Stewart.

Lalas was part of the United States Olympic soccer team for the 1992 Summer Olympics in Spain. He was also selected as overage player on the United States Olympic soccer team at the 1996 Summer Olympics.

Post-playing career 

Lalas served as president and General Manager of the San Jose Earthquakes during the 2004 and 2005 MLS seasons. He served as a General Manager of the MetroStars/New York Red Bulls from 2005 to 2006. Lalas served as President of the LA Galaxy from 2006 to 2008 during which time the club signed David Beckham. Following his time at the Galaxy, Lalas spent six years as a commentator for ESPN before signing a commentary deal with Fox Sports. He also appeared in both FIFA 16 and FIFA 17, by EA Sports, as a legend card having a solid 86 rated center back card in both iterations of the game.

Musical career
Lalas has released eight solo albums over the past three decades: Far from Close (1996), Ginger (1998), So It Goes (2010), Infinity Spaces (2014), Shots (2016), Sunshine (2018), Look at You (2019) and Melt Away (2022). With a noted affinity for rock music since college, Lalas played in a band named The Gypsies, opening for Hootie & The Blowfish during a European tour in 1998. The Gypsies were featured in a self-produced, self-distributed album Woodland, released by Lalas during the 1994 World Cup.

Career statistics

Club

International
Scores and results list the United States' goal tally first, score column indicates score after each Lalas goal.

Honors
Los Angeles Galaxy
CONCACAF Champions' Cup: 2000
Lamar Hunt U.S. Open Cup: 2001
MLS Cup: 2002
MLS Supporters' Shield: 2002

Rutgers
Hermann Trophy: 1991
Missouri Athletic Club Player of the Year: 1991

Individual
Honda Player of the Year: 1995
U.S. Soccer Athlete of the Year: 1995
MLS Best XI: 2002
MLS All-Star: 1996

References

External links
 Alexi Lalas at USSoccerPlayers
 
 
 
 
 

1970 births
Living people
American expatriate soccer players
American soccer players
United States men's international soccer players
Calcio Padova players
Cranbrook Educational Community alumni
1993 Copa América players
1993 CONCACAF Gold Cup players
1994 FIFA World Cup players
1995 Copa América players
1996 CONCACAF Gold Cup players
1998 CONCACAF Gold Cup players
1998 FIFA World Cup players
Footballers at the 1992 Summer Olympics
Footballers at the 1996 Summer Olympics
Hollywood United players
Sporting Kansas City players
LA Galaxy players
Major League Soccer executives
Major League Soccer players
American people of Greek descent
New York Red Bulls players
Major League Soccer All-Stars
National Soccer Hall of Fame members
New England Revolution players
Expatriate footballers in Italy
Olympic soccer players of the United States
People from Birmingham, Michigan
New York Red Bulls
Rutgers Scarlet Knights men's soccer players
San Jose Earthquakes executives
Soccer players from Michigan
C.S. Emelec footballers
Expatriate footballers in Ecuador
Serie A players
San Francisco Soccer Football League players
United States men's under-23 international soccer players
American expatriate sportspeople in Italy
Major League Soccer broadcasters
American male musicians
20th-century American musicians
Association football defenders
All-American men's college soccer players
Hermann Trophy men's winners
21st-century American musicians
Musicians from Michigan
American expatriates in Italy
Sportspeople from Oakland County, Michigan
Pan American Games gold medalists for the United States
Pan American Games medalists in football
Medalists at the 1991 Pan American Games
Footballers at the 1991 Pan American Games